Genie Chuo (born 20 January 1986) is a Taiwanese singer, actress and television host.

Life and career
Chuo won several karaoke competitions when she was a first year in the Taipei County Fuho Junior High School. After a number of lessons and training for singing, she debuted as a singer.
 
She attended Hua Kang Art School where she briefly dated Alien Huang during her first year. After graduating from high school, she continued recording, and has been active in television series in Taiwan including the 2007 drama, Romantic Princess and 2006 Taiwanese movie, Do Over (一年之初).

In 2010, Chuo sang the theme song for the theatrical drama Summer Snow directed by Golden Horse Awards winner Lee Hsing (李行). The EP was released on 30 July 2010 with proceeds going to the Red Cross.

Discography

Studio albums

Compilation albums

Soundtrack contribution

Collaboration
Song and Music video: 2007 Alien Huang & Genie Chuo – "愛的主旋律" [The Melody of Love]
Song and Music video: 2013/2014 Alien Huang & Genie Chuo – "心愛的" [Beloved]

Filmography

Television

Film

Awards and nominations

References

External links

 
 
  Genie Chuo International Club by Rock Records 
  Genie Chuo official blog

1986 births
Living people
Taiwanese film actresses
Taiwanese Mandopop singers
Taiwanese television actresses
Taiwanese television presenters
Actresses from New Taipei
21st-century Taiwanese actresses
21st-century Taiwanese singers
21st-century Taiwanese women singers
Musicians from New Taipei